Events from the year 1789 in France

Incumbents
 Monarch – Louis XVI

Events

Births
 4 January – Alphonse Henri d'Hautpoul, military officer and politician (died 1865)
 21 August – Augustin-Louis Cauchy, mathematician (died 1857)
 28 August – Stéphanie de Beauharnais, nobility (died 1860)
 31 December – Claudius Crozet, educator and engineer (died 1864)

Deaths

 2 February – Armand-Louis Couperin, composer and keyboard player (born 1727)
 9 May – Jean-Baptiste Vaquette de Gribeauval, artillery officer (born 1715)
 15 May – Jean-Baptiste Marie Pierre, painter (born 1714)
 15 July – Jacques Duphly, composer and harpsichordist (born 1715)
 3 December – Claude Joseph Vernet, painter (born 1714).
 23 December – Charles-Michel de l'Épée, philanthropist, developer of signed French (born 1712)

See also

References

1780s in France